The General German Trade Union Federation (ADGB) was a confederation of German trade unions in Germany founded during the Weimar Republic. It was founded in 1919 and was initially powerful enough to organize a general strike in 1920 against a right-wing coup d'état. After the 1929 Wall Street crash, the ensuing global financial crisis caused widespread unemployment. The ADGB suffered a dramatic loss of membership, both from unemployment and political squabbles. By the time the Nazis seized control of the government, the ADGB's leadership had distanced itself from the Social Democratic Party of Germany (SPD) and was openly cooperating with Nazis in an attempt to keep the organization alive. Nonetheless, on May 2, 1933, the SA and SS stormed the offices of the ADGB and its member trade unions, seized their assets and arrested their leaders, crushing the organization.

History 
The ADGB was founded on July 5, 1919 in Nuremberg after the first postwar congress of free trade unions. The ADGB was founded as the new umbrella organization to succeed the General Commission of Germany's Trade Unions (Generalkommission der Gewerkschaften Deutschlands). Carl Legien was elected as the first chairman.

It was an amalgamation of 52 German trade unions and was affiliated with the General Federation of Free Employees (AfA-Bund) and the General German Civil Service Federation (Allgemeiner Deutscher Beamtenbund). The adjective "Allgemeiner" ("general") was added to the name because in March 1919, the Christian and liberal trade unions had already founded umbrella organizations called the Deutscher Gewerkschaftsbund.

An influential mass organization under Legien's leadership, it organized a general strike in 1920 to counter the right-wing Kapp Putsch. Roughly 12 million workers took part, halting all production, transportation, mining and public services and, as The New York Times wrote, "giving the Kapp régime its death blow".

The free trade unions were not politically neutral; rather, they saw themselves as the economic arm of the socialist labor movement. Next to the free trade unions, were the Christian trade unions and the liberal unions. Neither were ever able to reach the membership numbers of the free trade unions. In 1920, the unions of the ADGB had over 8 million members, but the international financial crisis at the end of the decade caused high unemployment, leading to a substantial drop in the membership of member unions. By the end of 1932, there were an estimated 3.5 million members.

Despite the split in the SPD during World War I, the free trade unions continued to remain close to the SPD, the largest working class political party. Together, the SPD and the ADGB fought for the introduction unemployment benefits and a legally mandated eight-hour workday, which was gutted by regulations established in 1923. At the end of 1931, they united with the Reichsbanner and workers' sport clubs to form the Iron Front against the growing threat of the Nazi Party.

At first, ADGB unions were open to members of other working class political parties including the Communist Party of Germany (KPD). This changed in 1929, when the KPD, under pressure from the Soviet Union, began to run competing candidates at factory works council elections. The Revolutionäre Gewerkschafts Opposition (RGO), was founded in December 1929 as a communist opposition labor organization, hoping to draw left-wing unionists away from the ADGB., which led to the expulsion of many communists from the ADGB. By March 1932, the RGO had about 200,000 members.

The evening of the day Hitler was declared to be the new chancellor by president Hindenburg, January 30,
Walter Ulbricht of the communist party delivered a renewed proposal for a joint call for a general strike, similar to the successful strike against the Kapp Putsch of 1920, to the ADGB general union.  The trade unions and SPD declined the offer and issued, opposing it, leaflets, posters and articles calling workers to ignore all calls for a strike issued solely by the communist party during February and March 1933.  

After the Nazis seized power in the election of March 1933, the trade union leadership tried to save their organizations by pandering to the Nazi Party and in April 1933, offered "to put themselves in service to the new state". At the same time, ADGB chairman Theodor Leipart, began to distance himself from the SPD and declared the ADGB to be politically neutral. This policy resulted in the call by the national board to partake in "National Labor Day", the Nazi version of International Workers' Day, (also called "May Day"), a left-wing celebration of labor, and led to a break with the International Federation of Trade Unions. Even as the Nazis were planning to storm union offices, ADGB leaders met with leaders of the Christian and liberal labor organization for talks about a merger in the hopes of forestalling a prohibition of organized labor.

These efforts failed to prevent the free trade unions from a nationwide surprise attack the day after May Day, just two months later. On May 2, 1933, all ADGB member union were stormed, their offices occupied and assets seized by the SA, SS and the National Socialist Factory Cell Organization. Officials were put in "protective custody" and many trade unionists were maltreated. In Duisburg, four trade union officials were brutally murdered.

Non-profit entities 
The ADGB operated several non-profit companies. In 1924, a workers' bank was founded, the Bank der Deutschen Arbeit. On July 29, 1928, the cornerstone was laid for the Bundesschule des Allgemeinen Deutschen Gewerkschaftsbundes (ADGB Trade Union School) in Bernau bei Berlin, Brandenburg. The school operated for only three years, until the Nazis gained power, after which the Nazis used part of the school to train the SS.

ADGB school after the war 

After World War II, the school was used by occupying Russian military forces and from 1946 by the Free German Trade Union Federation (FDGB), an East German organisation. Its existence was forgotten and the 12-acre site was not open to the public. Only after the fall of the Berlin Wall, was it rediscovered. The East Germans had made significant renovations to the building to the extent that it was not recognized by architects looking for it after 1989.

The original complex was designed by the newly appointed director of the Bauhaus School, Hannes Meyer and his colleague Hans Wittwer. The design followed its architects' . The complex needed to house facilities to train and educate 120 people. The result was a Z-Shaped series of buildings that housed class-rooms, library, gymnasium and dining hall along with the insertion of a glass-blocked ceiling. Despite the extremely functional approach, materials were used in an expressive way including concrete, glass blocks and steel encasement windows.

The complex was restored to its former glory following a Europe-wide competition for the contract. The Berlin Chamber of Crafts paid a portion of the costs and has used it as a training school since 2007. In 2008 the restoration project won the architects, Brenne Gesellschaft von Architekten, the World Monuments Fund / Knoll Modernism Prize. In July 2017 the former ADGB Trade Union School was added to the UNESCO World Heritage Site the Bauhaus and its Sites in Weimar, Dessau and Bernau.

Affiliates
The following unions held membership of the federation:

See also 
 Cuno strikes
 Gewerkschaftsbund des Memelgebietes
 Verband der Fabrikarbeiter Deutschlands
 ADGB Trade Union School

Footnotes

References

External links 

 Die Arbeit (1924–1933) Friedrich Ebert Stiftung Retrieved August 6, 2011 
 Prohibition of Free Trade-Unions: SA Members Seize the Union Office on Engelsufer in Berlin (May 2, 1933)  Retrieved 30 October, 2016
 Photos of ADGB badge and publication German Historical Museum. Retrieved August 8, 2011 
 ADGB Trade Union School on Architectuul

Organizations based in the Weimar Republic
Labor history
Defunct trade unions of Germany
1919 establishments in Germany
1933 disestablishments in Germany
Trade unions established in 1919
Trade unions disestablished in 1933